Krasny Klyuch is a rural locality (a village) in Kameyevsky Selsoviet, Mishkinsky District, Bashkortostan, Russia. The population was 3 as of 2010. There is 1 street.

Geography 
Krasny Klyuch is located 27 km southeast of Mishkino (the district's administrative centre) by road. Bayturovo is the nearest rural locality.

References 

Rural localities in Mishkinsky District